Cresponea is a genus of lichens in the family Roccellaceae. The genus, circumscribed in 1993, contains species that were formerly classified in Lecanactis. Cresponea is widely distributed, but most species are found in tropical and subtropical regions. The genus is named in honor of Spanish lichenologist Ana Crespo.

Species
, Species Fungorum accepts 19 species of Cresponea.
Cresponea ancistrosporelloides 
Cresponea apiculata 
Cresponea chloroconia 
Cresponea endosulphurea 
Cresponea flava 
Cresponea flavescens 
Cresponea flavosorediata 
Cresponea follmannii 
Cresponea japonica 
Cresponea leprieurii 
Cresponea leprieuroides 
Cresponea lichenicola 
Cresponea litoralis 
Cresponea macrocarpoides 
Cresponea melanocheiloides 
Cresponea plurilocularis 
Cresponea premnea  
Cresponea proximata 
Cresponea sorediata

References

Roccellaceae
Arthoniomycetes genera
Lichen genera
Taxa described in 1993